Ajibola is a surname. Notable people with the surname include:

Bola Ajibola (born 1934), Nigerian judge
Olanrewaju Ajibola (born 1975), Nigerian chess player
Samuel Ajibola, Nigerian actor and model
Simon Ajibola, Nigerian politician

Surnames of African origin